Gösta Valdemar Jönsson (later Frändfors, 25 November 1915 – 8 August 1973) was a Swedish wrestler. He competed at the 1936 and 1948 Summer Olympics and won a bronze and a silver medal in the featherweight and lightweight freestyle divisions, respectively. He won three more medal at the European championships of 1937–1947, competing in freestyle and Greco-Roman wrestling. In 1947, after becoming the European champion in the Greco-Roman 67 kg division, he was awarded the Svenska Dagbladet Gold Medal.

He was born Gösta Valdemar Jönsson, and in 1941 changed his last name to Frändfors. He retired from competitions in October 1950, and in 1951 played the a minor role in the film Spöke på semester.

References

1915 births
1973 deaths
Olympic wrestlers of Sweden
Wrestlers at the 1936 Summer Olympics
Wrestlers at the 1948 Summer Olympics
Swedish male sport wrestlers
Olympic silver medalists for Sweden
Olympic bronze medalists for Sweden
Olympic medalists in wrestling
Medalists at the 1948 Summer Olympics
Medalists at the 1936 Summer Olympics
Sportspeople from Stockholm